Angelo Santucci (born February 5, 1951) is a former Canadian football running back for the Hamilton Tiger-Cats, Edmonton Eskimos and Ottawa Rough Riders from 1975 to 1984.

Santucci played university football for the St. Mary's Huskies starting in 1971.

Some of his career highlights include being the Most Outstanding Rookie nominee in 1975 for the Hamilton Tiger-Cats, and winning five Grey Cup Championships with Edmonton Eskimos from 1978 to 1982. In the 1978 Grey Cup game, Santucci was selected as the Outstanding Canadian being awarded with the Dick Suderman Trophy.

References

1952 births
Living people
Canadian football running backs
Edmonton Elks players
Hamilton Tiger-Cats players
Canadian people of Italian descent
Ottawa Rough Riders players
Players of Canadian football from Ontario
Saint Mary's Huskies football players
Saint Mary's University (Halifax) alumni
Sportspeople from Hamilton, Ontario